In automotive design, an R4, or Rear-engine, Four-wheel-drive layout places the internal combustion engine at the rear of the vehicle, and drives all four roadwheels.

This layout is typically chosen to improve the traction or the handling of existing vehicle designs using the rear-engine, rear-wheel-drive layout (RR).

The R4 layout is very rare, only having been used on a small number of production vehicles. Notable vehicles with this layout include several high-performance Porsche sports cars, including the 959, the 911 Turbo since the introduction of the turbocharged version of the 993 series in 1995, and the 911 Carrera 4 introduced with the 964 series in 1989.

Some Volkswagen Kübelwagen (the rear-engined beetle-based military vehicle used by Germany in World War II) variants were produced with 4-wheel or all-wheel drive, including the Type 86, Type 87, Type 98. Also, some Vanagons/Microbuses came in 4WD Syncro version.

Examples

References

Taylor, Blaine (2004). Volkswagen Military Vehicles of the Third Reich. Cambridge, Massachusetts: Da Capo Press. .  .
Road Trippers, Syncro

External links
 Porsche - 1989 Porsche 911 Carrera Coupé, Cabriolet, Targa, Speedster, and 4 Coupé
 Porsche - 1989 Porsche Turbo 911 Coupé, Cabriolet, and Targa
 Official website of Porsche
 993 Owners and information
 Information on and about Porsche 993
 Porsche 911 Carrera 2 (Generation 993) Exterior and Interior in Full HD 3D YouTube
-Driving Americas with VW Westfalia 4x4 Extreme Adventure,  YouTube 

Four-wheel drive layout